Michael Bach (March 1808, Boppard –17 April 1878) was a German entomologist specialising in Coleoptera.
He was a teacher in Boppard and a Member of the Entomological Society of Stettin.

Works
Käferfauna für Nord- und Mitteldeutschland mit besonderer Rücksicht auf die Preussischen Rheinlande. III. Band, 5. Lieferung. Coblenz, 142 pp. 
Nachtrage und Verbesserungen zur Käferfauna von Nord- und Mitteldeutschland. Stettin. Ent. Ztg., 17, 7/8: 241-247 (1856). 
Bach M. 1859. 
Kaferfauna für Nord- und Mitteldeutschland Init besonderer Rucksicht auf die Preussischen Rheinlande. III. Band, 6. Lieferung. Coblenz, 143-317 s. (1859)
Nachträge, Zusätze und Verbesserungen zum 3. Bande der Käferfauna. Coblenz, pp. 319–364 (1867).
 Studien und Lesefrüchte aus dem Buche der Natur : für jeden Gebildeten, zunächst für die reifere Jugend und ihre Lehrer . Vol.1-4 . Bachem, Köln 1867-1880 Digital edition by the University and State Library Düsseldorf

References

Osborn, H. 1952: A Brief History of Entomology Including Time of Demosthenes and Aristotle to Modern Times with over Five Hundred Portraits. Columbus, Ohio, The Spahr & Glenn Company : 1-303

German entomologists
1808 births
1878 deaths